Fazlabad (also Romanized as Faẕlābād) is a village in Shahrestaneh Rural District, Now Khandan District, Dargaz County, Razavi Khorasan Province, Iran. At the 2006 census, its population was 84, in 31 families.

References 

Populated places in Dargaz County